The Boys from County Clare is a 2003 Irish comedy/drama film about a céilí band from Liverpool that travels to Ireland to compete in a céilí competition in County Clare. Directed by John Irvin, the film was released in Canada on September 12, 2003, and in the U.S., on a limited release, on March 13, 2005.

The film was entitled The Boys and Girl from County Clare for the U.S. release and The Great Ceili War for the U.K. release.

Plot
Set in 1965, Jimmy McMahon (Colm Meaney) is an Irishman living in Liverpool who directs a céilí band of young men who go to a competition of traditional Celtic music in Ireland in County Clare. A native Irish band directed by John Joe McMahon (Bernard Hill) is also present to compete as well, with animosity between Jimmy and John, as they are brothers. The two brothers could not be more different, as they have taken different paths. There are multiple surprises for them as the competition takes place, with a familial twist at the very end.

We start on a flashback of a kid’s past performing as a musician. We then flash forward 40 years to Liverpool where we see Jimmy arrive at the Shamrock performance center. He coaches his musicians on how to best play their songs in the irish manner. We then cut to John Joe performing in a pub in a different lifestyle. We then see Jimmy and his band on the way to a competition and go on the road. John Joe will also compete in the competition and Jimmy has paid to sabotage John Joe to get there late. John Joe and Jimmy are drifting to register in the competition. Both have trouble getting to registration but eventually both arrive at the festival. They both register as it's revealed they are old friends that went on different paths of life. They have a deep competitive and antagonistic spirit. Since John Joe got a ride, Jimmy fires his saboteurs as they failed at their job. Teddy and Alex hang out in the pub and meet a girl.

The competition starts with kids participating first. Teddy takes a liking to the girl and makes more conversation with her. John Joe’s band starts to do their performance. One of John Joe’s associates steals Jimmy’s instrument. Jimmy steals another violin from a kid and begins their performance. John Joe brings it back during the performance to make up for this major mistake. It is revealed Jimmy is the father of Ann and his former lover is not happy on how he treated her. Ann is upset and wants a drink and goes with Teddy. We also learn John and Jimmy are also brothers. They begin a chat in the pub. Ann gets drunk and they go back to her place. Her mom is not happy she’s hanging with Teddy. Her mom reveals she did not marry her father as he was already married so she decided to not tell Ann about him at all due to that. John, Jimmy and Ann’s mother talk in the pub. They wrestle with the past and with Ann seeing Teddy. Later that night everyone gathers as they announce the winner. The winner is Father and his South African band. So it was a surprise to John and Jimmy. Teddy makes Ann a proposal for her to come with the band to Liverpool. Ann wants to but her mom does not recommend it. Ann’s mother eventually accepted it and realized she was wrong to oppose her leaving. Both musicians return to their normal lives and life goes on.

Cast 
 Bernard Hill as John Joe McMahon
 Andrea Corr as Anne
 Charlotte Bradley as Maisie
 Stephan Brennan as Miko
 Colm Meaney as Jimmy McMahon
 Eamonn Owens as Pat
 Shaun Evans as Teddy
 Ian Shaw as Johnny
 Brendan O'Hare as Brendan
 Malachy Bourke as Ben
 Leslie Bingham as Leslie
 Phillip Barantini as Alex
 Frank Twomey as Roger  
 Emmet Kirwan as Clive
 Patrick Bergin as Padjo

Awards
Winner - Best Supporting Actress, Charlotte Bradley - Irish Film and Television Awards
Nominated - Best Music, Fiachra Trench - Irish Film and Television Awards
Winner - Best Actress, Andrea Corr - U.S. Comedy Arts Festival

Reception 
The film received mixed reviews from critics. The review aggregation website Rotten Tomatoes gives the film a score of 46%, based on reviews from 28 critics. The website's consensus reads, "The Boys and Girl from County Clare is a charming - if entirely predictable - story about sibling rivalry featuring lively traditional Irish music."

References

External links
 

Irish musical comedy-drama films
2003 films
2000s musical comedy-drama films
Films directed by John Irvin
Films set in 1965
2003 comedy films
2003 drama films
English-language Irish films
English-language German films
2000s English-language films